The following highways are numbered 785:

United States
  Interstate 785
  Maryland Route 785
  Ohio State Route 785
  Puerto Rico Highway 785
  Virginia State Route 785